HD 153201 is a Bp star in the southern constellation of Ara. It is chemically peculiar star that displays an anomalous abundance of the element silicon in its spectrum. This is a suspected variable star of the type known as Alpha² Canum Venaticorum. There is a magnitude 9.86 companion star at an angular separation of 2.30″ along a position angle of 131°.

References

External links
 HIP 83269
 CCDM J17011-5633
 Image HD 153201

Ara (constellation)
Alpha2 Canum Venaticorum variables
153201
083269
B-type main-sequence stars
Durchmusterung objects